"The Weight" is the 43rd episode of the HBO original series The Sopranos and the fourth episode of the show's fourth season. Written by Terence Winter and directed by Jack Bender, it originally aired on October 6, 2002. This episode marks the halfway point (43rd out of 86) of the series.

Starring
 James Gandolfini as Tony Soprano
 Lorraine Bracco as Dr. Jennifer Melfi 
 Edie Falco as Carmela Soprano
 Michael Imperioli as Christopher Moltisanti
 Dominic Chianese as Corrado Soprano, Jr. 
 Steven Van Zandt as Silvio Dante
 Tony Sirico as Paulie Gualtieri *
 Robert Iler as Anthony Soprano, Jr. 
 Jamie-Lynn Sigler as Meadow Soprano
 Drea de Matteo as Adriana La Cerva 
 Aida Turturro as Janice Soprano *
 Vincent Curatola as Johnny Sack
 Steven R. Schirripa as Bobby Baccalieri
 Federico Castelluccio as Furio Giunta
 Joe Pantoliano as Ralph Cifaretto

* = credit only

Guest starring

Synopsis

Johnny is consumed with anger about Ralphie's joke about Ginny, leading him to savagely assault a member of Ralphie's crew who he happens to see laughing. When Tony confronts him, he blames his anger issues, but also says he loves his "Rubenesque" wife. On Tony's instructions, Ralphie phones Johnny to try to make peace, but he ends up apologizing; Johnny takes this as an admission of guilt and is further angered.

Johnny asks Carmine to allow a hit on Ralphie; he refuses. There are then two sit-downs. Johnny walks out of the first because Ralphie is present. At the second, Ralphie is not present, but Johnny remains inflexible and insists on retaliation to protect his honor. Carmine turns him down again and tells him to "get the fuck over it." Johnny walks out again.

Carmine hints to Tony that Johnny can be killed, and Silvio and Christopher arrange for it to be done in Boston, where Johnny is visiting his father. Simultaneously, Johnny arranges for Ralphie to be killed in Miami, where he is staying in a hotel.

Johnny leaves home for Boston, but goes back to retrieve something. He finds Ginny with a stash of junk food and candy. She cries. He reminds her that he never asked her to lose weight, but he is deeply hurt that she has lied to him. He calls off the hit at the last moment, and tells Tony he will accept Ralphie's apology.

Meadow joins a law center representing underprivileged clients in the South Bronx. Tony is not pleased that she is drifting away from her plan to be a pediatrician.

Carmela and Tony argue bitterly about their finances. She and Furio, who comes each morning to pick Tony up, are growing closer. He has bought a house and she goes to see it with A.J. At the housewarming party, Carmela and Furio dance together to sensual Italian music.

Tony buys her some flowers and a little black dress from Saks Fifth Avenue. She puts it on. Greatly aroused, he takes her to bed. As he lies heavily on top of her, her eyes open and she imagines that she hears the music to which she and Furio danced.

First appearances
Joseph "Joey Peeps" Peparelli: Associate in the Lupertazzi crime family. Driver/bodyguard of Johnny Sack
Brian Cammarata: Carmela's cousin and the family's "financial adviser"

Title reference
 The title refers to the joke Ralph Cifaretto made about Ginny Sacrimoni's weight in "No Show," a joke which Johnny Sack eventually learned about from Paulie Gualtieri; this remark almost cost two arguing mobsters their lives.
 This episode also shares its title with "The Weight," a song by The Band.

References to other episodes
 Ralph told the joke about Ginny's weight in "No Show"
 When Ralph calls Johnny Sack to deny he told the "mole joke," Johnny says that he "should have let Tony chop off [Ralph's] head a year ago," referring to when Ralph and Tony were on the outs, and Tony was considering killing Ralph in the season 3 episode, "He Is Risen."
While visiting Meadow's dorm, Tony sees Meadow's graduation picture taken in the episode "Funhouse."
Ralph asks, "What? You never made a joke about Ginny Sack?" to the guys.  They all respond, "No! Not like that!" In season 3 episode, "Employee of the Month" all of them can be seen making even cruder jokes about Ginny. In that episode, Johnny Sack walks in on the guys and is immediately suspicious.

Cultural references
 Johnny mentions that Ginny has tried to lose weight with the help of Weight Watchers and Richard Simmons.
 Johnny says his wife is "Rubenesque," voluptuous, like the women painted by Peter Paul Rubens.
Upon seeing Ralph in formal wear, Eugene calls him George Hamilton.
Believing Johnny to be overreacting to his joke about Ginny, Ralph compares him to Walter Raleigh.
Junior tells Tony the story of how Lou earned the nickname "DiMaggio", which involved him beating his former boss and his wife to death with a baseball bat.
 When Chris and Silvio visit Frank and DiMaggio to set up the hit on Johnny, DiMaggio tells a story about murdering a man named Tommy Neri. The name Tommy Neri is a nod to the actor Richard Bright, who plays Frank Crisci in this episode. Richard Bright played a Corleone hitman named Al Neri in The Godfather.

Music
 Music from Furio's housewarming includes "O'Mare" and in particular "Vesuvio", by the Italian band Spaccanapoli, which is later played over the end credits.
 "Suddenly Last Summer" by The Motels plays in the background when Furio visits Carmela.
 One scene at the Bada Bing features ZZ Top's "Tush", a subtextual reference to the joke about the mole removed from Ginny's tush - Tony refers to Ginny's tush immediately before the Bada Bing office door opens and "Tush" is heard blaring from within the club.
 Music playing in the background at the Atwell Avenue Boys' house is "No Other Love" by Rodgers and Hammerstein.
 "Sally Go 'Round the Roses" by The Jaynetts plays on Johnny Sack's car radio.

External links
"The Weight"  at HBO

The Sopranos (season 4) episodes
2002 American television episodes
Television episodes written by Terence Winter